James Duncan Wiemer (born January 9, 1961) is a Canadian former professional ice hockey defenceman who played for the Buffalo Sabres, New York Rangers, Edmonton Oilers, Los Angeles Kings and Boston Bruins in the National Hockey League (NHL) between 1983 and 1993.

Hockey career
Wiemer began his path to the pros in Peterborough, Ontario with the Peterborough Petes of the Ontario Hockey League in 1978. He helped his team to the 1979 Memorial Cup Championship and continued his playing career in Peterborough until the end of the 1980–81 OHL season. Wiemer had his most productive season in 1980–81 when he recorded 95 points on 41 goals and 54 assists. During his tenure there, he was selected in the 1980 NHL Entry Draft by the Buffalo Sabres with the 83rd pick in the fourth round.

Wiemer began his professional career with the Rochester Americans of the American Hockey League (AHL) under coach Mike Keenan. He was originally drafted as a forward and was later moved back to defence by Keenan. He was an integral part in the 1983 Calder Cup Championship run.

Wiemer began his National Hockey League career and began to bounce around a bit to the aforementioned teams. He experienced his first trade in the NHL on December 6, 1984, when the Sabres traded Wiemer and Steve Patrick to the New York Rangers in exchange for Chris Renaud and Dave Maloney.

In 1986, he was traded by the Rangers to the Edmonton Oilers. In the 1987–88 season, Wiemer played 12 regular season games, and two games in the Conference Final playoff for the Oilers, and has a Stanley cup Ring. However, his name was not included on the Stanley Cup. The criteria to get your name on the cup is to play 41 or more games for the winning team during the regular season, and/or one game played in the Stanley Finals. After playing mostly for the Oilers' farm team in the AHL the next season, he was traded to the Los Angeles Kings in March 1989.

In July 1989, Wiemer signed as a free agent with the Boston Bruins where he found a solid home. Under coach Mike Milbury, Wiemer was a solid fixture on the blueline with Boston for the better part of four seasons. Wiemer was a member of the Bruins' organization for one more season with their AHL team. In 1994, Wiemer returned to the Rochester Americans for his final season.

Wiemer finished his playing career with 325 games played in the NHL (387 including playoffs). He scored 101 (114 including playoffs) points in his NHL career on 29 goals and 72 assists (34 and 80 including playoffs) with 378 penalty minutes and a plus/minus of +17 (437 and +14 including playoffs). Over his full professional career, he scored 999 career points.

Career statistics

Regular season and playoffs

International

Awards
 1985–86 - Eddie Shore Award as the AHL's top defenceman.

In 2010, Wiemer was inducted into the Rochester Americans Hall of Fame along with former teammate Randy Cunneyworth and trainer Kent Weisbeck.

References

External links
 

1961 births
Living people
Boston Bruins players
Buffalo Sabres draft picks
Buffalo Sabres players
Canadian ice hockey defencemen
Cape Breton Oilers players
Edmonton Oilers players
Ice hockey people from Ontario
Los Angeles Kings players
Maine Mariners players
New Haven Nighthawks players
New York Rangers players
Nova Scotia Oilers players
Sportspeople from Greater Sudbury
Peterborough Petes (ice hockey) players
Providence Bruins players
Rochester Americans players
Stanley Cup champions